Wolfgang Becker (1910–2005) was a German film director and film editor.

Selected filmography

Editor
 The Night Without Pause (1931)
 Spoiling the Game (1932)
 Spell of the Looking Glass (1932)
 The Star of Valencia (1933)
 The Country Schoolmaster (1933)
 A Door Opens (1933)
 Gold (1934)
 Love, Death and the Devil (1934)
 Frisians in Peril (1935)
 Marriage Strike (1935)
 Ninety Minute Stopover (1936)
 The Coral Princess (1937)
 Meiseken (1937)
The Chief Witness (1937)
 The Great and the Little Love (1938)
 The Woman at the Crossroads (1938)
 Via Mala (1945)
 And the Heavens Above Us (1947)
 The Last Illusion (1949)

Director
 Heroism after Hours (1955)
  (1956)
  (1957)
 Voyage to Italy, Complete with Love (1958)
 I Was All His (1958)
 Peter Voss, Thief of Millions (1958)
  (1959)
 Die letzten Drei der Albatros (1965)
  (1967, TV miniseries)
  (1968, TV miniseries)
 Der Kommissar (1969–1975, TV series, 18 episodes)
  (1969)
  (1969, TV film)
 11 Uhr 20 (1970, TV miniseries)
  (1970)
 Kein Geldschrank geht von selber auf (1971, TV film)
 Der kleine Doktor (1974, TV series, 6 episodes)
 Tatort: Acht Jahre später (1974, TV series episode)
 Tatort: Zweikampf (1974, TV series episode)
 Derrick (1975–1992, TV series, 11 episodes)
 Tatort: Die Abrechnung (1975, TV series episode)
 Tatort: Treffpunkt Friedhof (1975, TV series episode)
 Tatort: Fortuna III (1976, TV series episode)
 Tatort: Abendstern (1976, TV series episode)
 The Old Fox (1977–1988, TV series, 5 episodes)
 Tatort: Drei Schlingen (1977, TV series episode)
  (1977, TV film)
 Tatort: Rechnung mit einer Unbekannten (1978, TV series episode)
 Tatort: Lockruf (1978, TV series episode)
  (1979, TV film)
 Von einem Tag zum anderen (1981, TV film)
 Tatort: Peggy hat Angst (1983, TV series episode)
 Damenwahl (1985, TV film)

References

Bibliography 
 Bock, Hans-Michael & Bergfelder, Tim. The Concise Cinegraph: Encyclopaedia of German Cinema. Berghahn Books, 2009.

External links 

 

1910 births
2005 deaths
German film directors
German film editors
Mass media people from Berlin